Acupicta, or Catapaecilma, is a genus of butterflies in the family Lycaenidae. The species are found in the Indomalayan and Australasian realms.

Species
 Acupicta bubases (Hewitson, 1875)
 Acupicta delicatum (de Nicéville, 1887)
 Acupicta flemingi Eliot, 1975
 Acupicta inopinatum Schröder & Treadaway, 1998
 Acupicta jeffreyi Müller, 2004
 Acupicta meeki Eliot, 1974
 Acupicta trajana Okubo, 2007

References

 
Catapaecilmatini
Lycaenidae genera
Taxa named by John Nevill Eliot